Brome Village is a municipality located in the Brome-Missisquoi Regional County Municipality of the Estrie region of Quebec, Canada, north of Sutton, surrounded by the Town of Brome Lake and recognized as the host of one of the most important agricultural exhibitions in Quebec, the Municipality of Brome Village benefits from an exceptional view of the Sutton Mountains, wide open spaces, tranquility as well as a spirit of cooperation and solidarity.. The population as of the Canada 2021 Census was 341.

Demographics 

Population trend:

Mother tongue language (2021)

Brome Fair 
Brome Fair ("Exposition de Brome" in French) is an agricultural fair that takes place annually on Labour Day weekend. It is the largest rural fair in Quebec, dating back to 1856.

Like most country fairs, in addition to agricultural exhibitions and contests, Brome fair hosts a variety of country music acts, rides, games, and motorsport events.

See also
List of village municipalities in Quebec

References

External links 

Villages in Quebec
Incorporated places in Brome-Missisquoi Regional County Municipality